Keefe Row, at E. 22nd St. and Evans Ave. in Cheyenne, Wyoming, was built in 1892.  It was listed on the National Register of Historic Places in 1979.

It is a row of nine one-and-a-half-story brick residences.  All are built on rusticated sandstone foundations.

They were designed by Cheyenne architect J.P. Julien.

References

National Register of Historic Places in Laramie County, Wyoming
Romanesque Revival architecture in Wyoming
Buildings and structures completed in 1892